Akil Neomon Baddoo (born August 16, 1998) is an American professional baseball outfielder for the Detroit Tigers of Major League Baseball (MLB). He made his MLB debut in 2021.

Early life
Baddoo was born in Silver Spring, Maryland to parents John and Akilah. His father is originally from Ghana and his mother is from Trinidad and Tobago. He was educated and played varsity baseball at Salem High School in Conyers, Georgia.

Career

Minnesota Twins
Baddoo was drafted out of high school by the Minnesota Twins in the second round of the 2016 Major League Baseball draft. After two seasons in Twins' rookie leagues, he was assigned to the Class A Cedar Rapids Kernels for the 2018 season. In 113 games, Baddoo hit .243 with 11 home runs, 40 RBI and 24 stolen bases. He moved up to the Class A+ Fort Myers Miracle for the 2019 season, but played only 29 games before requiring Tommy John surgery on his left elbow.

Detroit Tigers
On December 10, 2020, the Detroit Tigers selected Baddoo with the third pick in the 2020 Rule 5 draft. Baddoo made the team's 2021 Opening Day roster after hitting .325 with 5 home runs in the spring training season.

He made his major league debut on April 4, hitting a home run in his first at-bat, on the first pitch he saw from Cleveland Indians starter Aaron Civale. Baddoo became the ninth player in Tigers' franchise history to hit a home run in his first major league at-bat, and only the second to do so on the first pitch, following George Vico who accomplished the feat in 1948. The following day, Baddoo hit his first career grand slam off of Randy Dobnak of the Minnesota Twins. He became the first player in franchise history to hit a home run in his first two career games and the first player in MLB history to do so from the ninth spot in the batting order.

On April 6, Baddoo recorded his first career walk-off hit, a tenth-inning RBI single off of Twins closer Hansel Robles to give the Tigers a 4–3 victory. He became the first Tiger with a walk-off hit within his first three major league games since Gabe Alvarez in 1998 and the first MLB player since at least 1900 with two homers, including a grand slam, and a walk-off hit in his first three career games. On April 13, Baddoo recorded his fourth home run of the season. He became the first player in franchise history to post four homers and 10 RBIs within his first eight games, and the first major league player to do so since Kyle Lewis in 2019. He also became the first Tigers' player since Don Ross in 1931, and the sixth player in MLB history, to drive in a run in at least six of his first eight career games.

On August 11, Baddoo was placed on the 7-day concussion protocol injured list, following a collision with center fielder Derek Hill the previous night. Baddoo was activated off the injured list on August 23. Baddoo finished the 2021 season hitting .259 with 13 home runs and 55 RBI, while stealing 18 bases in 22 attempts. Baddoo earned the Detroit Tigers-Detroit Sports Media Association 2021 Rookie of the Year award.

Baddoo made the 2022 Opening day roster and began the season as the Tigers' center fielder. On May 9, he was sent down to AAA Toledo Mud Hens after posting a .140 average. After hitting .300 with a .405 on-base percentage in 30 games with Toledo, he was recalled to the Tigers on July 11. He finished the season hitting .204 with 2 home runs.

See also
List of Major League Baseball players with a home run in their first major league at bat

References

External links

1998 births
Living people
African-American baseball players
Baseball players from Georgia (U.S. state)
Cedar Rapids Kernels players
Detroit Tigers players
Elizabethton Twins players
Fort Myers Miracle players
Gulf Coast Twins players
Major League Baseball outfielders
People from Conyers, Georgia
American sportspeople of Ghanaian descent
American sportspeople of Trinidad and Tobago descent
21st-century African-American sportspeople